The 1st Artistic Gymnastics World Championships were held in Antwerp, Belgium, in conjunction with the 27th Belgian Federal Festival, on 14-18 August 1903.

Participants

Results

Men's individual all-around

Men's team all-around

Men's horizontal bar

Men's parallel bars

Men's pommel horse

Men's rings

Medal table

References 

World Artistic Gymnastics Championships
Sports competitions in Antwerp
International gymnastics competitions hosted by Belgium
World Artistic Gymnastics Championships, 1903
1903 in gymnastics
1900s in Antwerp